is a Japanese novelist and TV commentator. 

After graduating from Seikei University, he worked for a number of different advertising production companies and as a freelance copywriter.
In 1997, he published his first short story collection, Ikebukuro West Gate Park, which won the 36th All Yomimono New Mystery Writer's Prize. In 2003, he won the Naoki Prize for 4teen.

His novels describe the culture of young people in Japan, particularly young women and otaku without a college education. Many of his works have been adapted for manga and television. As an actor, he made his first appearance in a leading role in the 2006 film Love My Life.

Ishida's pen name, Ishida Ira, was derived by splitting his real family name Ishidaira.

Works in English translation
Novel
Call Boy (original title: Shōnen), trans. Lamar Stone (Shueisha English Edition, 2013)

Short story
Ikebukuro West Gate Park (Digital Geishas and Talking Frogs: The Best 21st Century Short Stories from Japan, Cheng & Tsui Company, 2011)

Awards and nominations
1997 - All Yomimono New Mystery Writer's Prize: Ikebukuro West Gate Park (short story)
2001 - Nominee for Naoki Prize: Call Boy
2002 - Nominee for Naoki Prize: Kotsuon: Ikebukuro West Gate Park 3
2003 - Naoki Prize: 4teen

Main works

Ikebukuro West Gate Park
Short story collections
, 1998

, 2000
, 2002
, 2003
, 2005
, 2006
, 2007
, 2008
, 2009
, 2010

Call Boy series
, 2001 (Call Boy, Shueisha English Edition, 2013)
, 2008
 Call Boy 3, 2018

Standalone novels
, 1999
, 1999
, 2001
, 2004
, 2004
, 2019

Short story collections
, 2002
, 2003

TV and film adaptations
Japanese TV dramas
Ikebukuro West Gate Park (TV series) (2000)
4teen (2004)
Akihabara@DEEP (2006)

Japanese film
Akihabara@DEEP (2006)
 (2018)

References

External links 
 Ira Ishida at J'Lit Books from Japan 

1960 births
Living people
Japanese writers
Japanese crime fiction writers
Writers from Tokyo